The BMW I Vision Circular is a concept car produced by German automaker BMW and introduced to the public at the IAA exhibition in 2021.

Design 
BMW says the I Vision Circular was built to imagine what an all electric compact luxury model from the brand could look like in 2040. The main priority with the concept was for it to be built using 100% recyclable and 100% recycled materials, including the solid state electric battery. BMW claims to have achieved the 100% recyclability goal, and says the concept is close to 100% use of recycled materials. The body of the I Vision Circular is made from a mixture of recycled aluminum, steel and plastic, with the aluminum anodized gold instead of paint, and the steel receiving heat treatment to make it blue. The exterior also features a single piece of glass for the windshield and roof, rear-hinged rear doors, digital graphics on the BMW kidney grilles, which double as the headlights, and similar graphics running along the bottom of the windows, which BMW say could be used to display vehicle information to people outside the car. Kai Langer, head of design at BMW's electric car division, BMW i, emphasized the sustainability of the design, and said the concept was designed with minimalism in mind, noting design decisions such as how the kidney grilles and headlights are combined, while also pointing out traditional BMW design elements such as the Hofmeister kink.

The interior features seating for 4 and uses many of the same materials as the exterior, adding recycled fabric, as well as a steering wheel and dashboard 3D printed using wood powder and illuminated crystal materials. Other methods used to improve recyclability include using multiple types of quick release fasteners and cords in place of traditional bonded connections, glue and composite materials to make the recycling process easier, laser etched badges, and tires made from sustainably cultivated natural rubber.

References

BMW concept vehicles